Armash is a village in Shekhan District, Nineveh Governorate of Iraq that falls on the main road that connects the cities of Duhok and Erbil. It is populated by Assyrians, who are mainly followers of the Chaldean Catholic Church.

As of 2012, the population of the village is around 160 inhabitants according to the population count by Wijnand D. Langeraar and Richard C. Michael.

History 
The village is first mentioned in a 9th century text by Toma Al-Merji, who writes that the village's Mar Afram monastery, which was standing along with another church until 1986, was extent in the 9th century. 

In 1961, about 45 families lived in the village, but many eventually fled. Prior to 1961 there were no schools in the village. Students from Armash and Azakh would walk to the town of Atroush (7 km away), where the nearest school  was. The village was subject to destruction by the Ba'ath regime in 1987.

An irrigation channel was built in the village for the first time in 1999 by the Assyrian Aid Society.

Gallery

See also
List of Assyrian villages

References

Populated places in Dohuk Province
Assyrian communities in Iraq